was a Japanese professional Go player.

Promotion record

References

External links
Nihon Ki-in profile 
GoBase.org profile
Sensei's Library profile

1956 births
2022 deaths
Japanese Go players
Ryukyuan people
People from Okinawa Prefecture